Secret of the Andes is a children's novel by Ann Nolan Clark. It won the 1953 Newbery Medal.

Plot summary

Cusi, a modern Inca boy, leaves his home high in the Andes mountains to learn the mysterious secret of his ancient ancestors. Accompanied by his pet llama, Misti, he slowly discovers the truth about his birth and his people's ancient glory. Now he must prove himself worthy to be entrusted with the fabulous secret from the past.

Historical accuracy 
Secret of the Andes is historical fiction. Some events were inspired by real events in history. In reality, the Inca King (Ataulpa) at one time was held for ransom by the Spaniards. However, llamas were not a part of the ransom, and the form of the gold was primarily solid, not gold dust.

Themes 
Themes of Secret of the Andes include racial identity, preservation of historical cultures, adoption, animal guides, royal lineage, and the Spanish conquest and betrayal of the Incan Empire.

Newbery Medal
E. B. White's Charlotte's Web was a runner-up for the Newbery Medal the year Secret of the Andes won the award.  According to a 2008 article by children's literature expert Anita Silvey in the School Library Journal, one member of the Newbery committee stated that she voted for Secret of the Andes rather than Charlotte's Web "because she hadn't seen any good books about South America."  Silvey further commented, "The Secret of the Andes is a good book; Charlotte's Web, the best."

References

Newbery Medal–winning works
1952 American novels
American children's novels
Novels set in Peru
Viking Press books
Children's historical novels
1952 children's books